Beneath the Wheel (Unterm Rad) is a 1906 novel written by Hermann Hesse. In 1957 it was reissued as The Prodigy, in the Peter Owen Publishers translation.  It severely criticizes education that focuses only on students' academic performance, and in that respect is typical of Hesse. There are also autobiographical elements in the story, as he attended and was expelled from the seminary described.

Plot summary
Beneath the Wheel is the story of Hans Giebenrath, a talented boy sent to a seminary in Maulbronn. His education is focused completely on increasing his knowledge, and neglects personal development. His close friendship with Hermann Heilner, a more liberal fellow student, is a source of comfort for Hans. Heilner is expelled from the seminary, and Giebenrath is sent home after his academic performance decreases in tandem with the onset of symptoms of mental illness.

Back home, he finds coping with his situation difficult, having lost most of his childhood to scholastic study, and thus having never formed lasting personal relationships with anyone in his village. He is apprenticed as a mechanic, and seems to find satisfaction in the work; it is visceral and concrete, as opposed to the intellectual abstraction of scholarly pursuit. Despite some personal fulfillment in his existence, Hans never fully adjusts to his new situation. On a pub crawl in a neighbouring village, he and his colleagues get drunk. Giebenrath leaves the group to walk home early.  Later, he is found to have drowned in a river.

References in other media 
Beneath the Wheel has been referenced in other media.

 The crossover thrash band D.R.I.'s 1989 album Thrash Zone references Beneath the Wheel on the song "Beneath the Wheel."

See also

 Bildungsroman

References

1906 German novels
Novels by Hermann Hesse
Novels set in Germany
Novels set in schools